CHRX-FM is a Canadian radio station that broadcasts an adult contemporary format at 98.5 MHz in Fort St. John, British Columbia with a rebroadcaster at 95.1 FM in Dawson Creek with the callsign CHRX-FM-1. 98.5's signal carries up to Wonowon, Rose Prairie and Dawson Creek. 95.1's signal carries up to just outside of Grande Prairie, south to Chetwynd, and up to Taylor. The station is branded as Move 98.5 and is owned by Bell Media.

The station began broadcasting in 1997.

Former logo

References

External links
Move 98.5
Astral Media's Radio site
 

Fort St. John, British Columbia
Hrx
Hrx
Hrx
Radio stations established in 1997
1997 establishments in British Columbia